was a Japanese character actor who made many appearances in films and on television from 1939 to 1989. He was a close friend of Kaneto Shindo and one of his regular cast members. He was also an essayist. In 1950 he helped form the film company Kindai Eiga Kyokai with Shindo and Kōzaburō Yoshimura.

He served in the Japanese military in China in the Second Sino-Japanese War and considered himself to have narrowly escaped from death. He was married but also had a mistress and maintained relationships with both women until the end of his life. He was a keen reader of detective stories and a fan of jazz music. He wrote a series of semi-autobiographical essays under the title , meaning "third rate actor". Kaneto Shindo wrote a biography of Tonoyama called Sanmon yakusha no shi, meaning "The death of a third-rate actor", which he also filmed as By Player.

Filmography (selected)

Books

Notes

References

External links

Goo Movies

1915 births
1989 deaths
20th-century Japanese male actors
Military personnel of the Second Sino-Japanese War